Abermule Amateur Football Club is a Welsh football team based in Abermule, Powys, mid Wales. The team currently play in the Central Wales League Northern Division, which is at the fourth tier of the Welsh football league system.

History
The club was formed in 1969 to play a number of friendly matches against neighbouring sides but did not officially enter the Montgomeryshire Football League until 1970.

In 2010–11 the club joined the newly formed Mid Wales Football League Division Two from the Mid Wales South League.

Honours

Montgomeryshire Football League Division Two – Champions: 1971–72
Montgomeryshire Football League Division Two – Runners-up: 1985–86, 1999–2000

External links
Club website
Club official Twitter

References

Sport in Powys
Mid Wales Football League clubs
Montgomeryshire Football League clubs
Football clubs in Wales
Association football clubs established in 1970
1970 establishments in Wales